Norton Children's Hospital, formerly Kosair Children's Hospital, is a pediatric acute care children's hospital located in Louisville, Kentucky and affiliated with the University of Louisville School of Medicine. The hospital has 300 pediatric beds, providing comprehensive pediatric specialties and subspecialties to infants, children, teens, young adults, age 0-21 throughout Kentucky and the surrounding states. Established in 1892 as Children's Free Hospital, it is part of Norton Healthcare. Norton Children's Hospital also features the region's only Level 1 Pediatric Trauma Center and Level IV Neonatal Intensive Care Unit. In 2016, actress Jennifer Lawrence, a Louisville native, donated $2 million to the Norton Children's Hospital in Louisville to set up a cardiac intensive care unit (CICU) named after her foundation.

History 
After a devastating tornado hit Louisville, activists decided to create a place where kids could receive specialized care. The hospital first incorporated in 1890 as Children's Free Hospital. In 1892, the Children's Free Hospital officially opened, becoming the #10 children's hospital to open in the United States. In 1910 a new $60,000, 75-bed hospital was opened to take the place of the original building. In 1930, Children's Free Hospital affiliated with the University of Louisville School of Medicine. In 1946, Children's Free Hospital renamed their hospital to Children's Hospital. In 1986 the modern day hospital opened at current location on East Chestnut Street. In 1988 the regions first pediatric trauma center opened in the hospital. In 2016 The Kosair Children's Hospital rebranded as Norton Children's Hospital.

Awards 
In 2014 Norton Children's Hospital ranked among the top 50 children's hospitals in the country and nationally ranked in six categories including #21 in cancer care, #24 in orthopedics, #24 in pulmonology, #29 in neurology and neurosurgery, #31 in urology, #40 in cardiology and heart surgery, and #51 in nephrology.

In 2020 Norton Children's Hospital ranked nationally in 3 specialties by the U.S. News & World Report. The ranked specialties were #42 in neonatalogy, #49 in diabetes and endocrinology, and #35 in urology. The hospital has the highest ratings of any children's hospital in Kentucky.

See also 

 Jennifer Lawrence
 Norton Healthcare
 List of children's hospitals in the United States

References

External links
 

Hospitals in Kentucky
Children's hospitals in the United States
Buildings and structures in Louisville, Kentucky
Hospitals established in 1892
1892 establishments in Kentucky
Pediatric trauma centers